Statue of Sacagawea may refer to:

 Sakakawea (Crunelle)
 Sacajawea and Jean-Baptiste, Washington Park, Portland, Oregon, U.S.